Leman may refer to:

People
 Leman (surname)
 Leman baronets, County of Hertford, England
 Leman Altınçekiç (1932–2001), first female jet pilot in Turkey
 Leman Bozacıoğlu (fl. 2006–2016), Turkish female football referee

Places
 Léman (department), a former département, under the Napoleonic First Empire, France
 Leman, Poland, a village in Podlaskie Voivodeship, Poland
 Léman, a French name for Lake Geneva, in Switzerland and France
 Leman, a town in Kersana Malima, Ethiopia

Education
 Collège du Léman, a private, international school in Versoix, Canton of Geneva, Switzerland
 Léman International School - Chengdu, China
 Léman Manhattan Preparatory School, a private school in New York City, New York, U.S.

Other meanings
 LeMan, a Turkish satirical magazine
 Leman, a Dublin-based rock band involved in RTÉ's 2006 production of You're a Star
 Leman, an archaic word for a man's unmarried (or extramarital) female lover

See also
 Lemans or Le Mans,a city in France
 Mount Leman, a mountain on the border of Alberta and British Columbia, Canada
 Tanjung Leman, a coastal area in Mersing District, Johor, Malaysia
 Lehman (disambiguation)
 Léman (disambiguation)
 Le Mans (disambiguation)